USS Keresaspa (ID-1484) was a United States Navy cargo ship in commission from 1918 to 1919.

Keresaspa was built in 1903 as the commercial cargo ship SS Franconia for an Austro-Hungarian firm, the Franconia Steamship Company, Limited, by the Northumberland Shipbuilding Company, at Newcastle, England. She had been renamed SS Keresaspa by the time the U.S. Navy acquired her on 31 October 1918 for World War I service. The Navy assigned her the naval registry Identification Number (Id. No.) 1484 and commissioned her the same day as USS Keresaspa.

Assigned to the Naval Overseas Transportation Service, Keresaspa departed New York City with a cargo of 400 horses and mules for transport to France. She discharged her cargo at La Pallice, France, and returned to the United States at Baltimore, Maryland, on 20 January 1919.

Following repairs Keresaspa was decommissioned on 11 February 1919 and returned to her owners. She returned to mercantile service, and was renamed SS Pannonia in 1922.

References

Department of the Navy: Naval Historical Center Online Library of Selected Images:  U.S. Navy Ships: USS Keresaspa (ID # 1484), 1918-1919
NavSource Online: Section Patrol Craft Photo Archive: Keresaspa (SP-1484)

World War I cargo ships of the United States
Ships built on the River Tyne
1903 ships
Cargo ships of the United States Navy